Joseph Forney Johnston (March 23, 1843 – August 8, 1913) was an American Democratic politician and businessman who was the 30th Governor of Alabama from 1896 to 1900. He later served in the United States Senate from August 6, 1907, to his death on August 8, 1913. As a senator, he was chair of the U.S. Senate Committee to Establish a University of the United States.

Biography
Born in Lincoln County, North Carolina, on March 23, 1843, Johnston attended the rural public schools in North Carolina during his youth. Johnston moved to Talladega, Alabama, at the age of seventeen and attended a military academy. At the outbreak of the American Civil War, Johnston enlisted as a private in the Confederate States Army. Johnston served through the duration of the war, receiving wounds at Chickamauga, Spotsylvania, New Market, and Petersburg. By the war's end, he attained the rank of captain.

After returning from the war, Johnston studied law under William H. Forney and was admitted to the bar. He practiced law in Selma, Alabama, eventually moving to Birmingham to become president of the Alabama National Bank. In 1887, Johnston became president of the Sloss Iron & Steel company, an industry thriving in Alabama.

Johnston first entered the political arena in 1890, when he ran for Alabama governor but lost to Thomas G. Jones. In 1896, he again ran for governor. He succeeded, serving two consecutive two-year terms as Governor of Alabama. Johnston's achievements during his tenure as governor include tax reform, creation of the Alabama Department of Insurance, and the establishment of a state mine inspector.

Johnston decided not to seek another term as governor in 1900 and challenged John Tyler Morgan in that year's Senate election. Morgan defeated Johnston, and in 1902, Johnston sought a third term as governor against incumbent William D. Jelks. The revelation of several scandals involving Sloss Iron & Steel and misconduct in the prison system hurt Johnston, and he would ultimately lose the election.

However, Johnston attained political office again by being elected to complete Senator Edmund Pettus's term after Pettus had died in office in 1907. Johnston was re-elected in 1909 and served in the Senate until his death from pneumonia in 1913.

Johnston was married to Theresa Virginia Hooper of South Carolina. They had three sons: William Hooper, Edward Douglas, and Forney. He is buried in Birmingham's Elmwood Cemetery.

See also
List of United States Congress members who died in office (1900–49)

References

External links

 Joseph F. Johnston at the Alabama Department of Archives & History 

Joseph F. Johnston, late a senator from Alabama, Memorial addresses delivered in the House of Representatives and Senate frontispiece 1915

1843 births
1913 deaths
Governors of Alabama
Democratic Party United States senators from Alabama
Confederate States Army officers
Democratic Party governors of Alabama
Alabama lawyers
Politicians from Birmingham, Alabama
People from Lincoln County, North Carolina
People of Alabama in the American Civil War
19th-century American politicians
Burials at Elmwood Cemetery (Birmingham, Alabama)
19th-century American lawyers